Caruso St John is a London-based architectural firm established in 1990 by Adam Caruso and Peter St John.

Practice 

Caruso St John gained international recognition for its designs of public spaces. The practice came to public attention with The New Art Gallery Walsall, a commission won in an international competition in 1995. From these origins in the visual arts, the firm now works on a broad range of public and private projects.

Clients 
Current and past clients include Tate Britain, the V&A, English Heritage and the Arts Council of England, as well as European housing developers Trudo, the SBB (Swiss National Railways), and the Gagosian Gallery. Caruso St John aims to have a wide range of work at a variety of scales and wants to resist the trend of increased size and specialisation that dominates contemporary architecture.

Works 

Royale Belge, Brussels (2023)
Chiswick House Cafe (2010)
Thomas Demand, Nationalgalerie (2009)
Nottingham Contemporary (2009)
Frieze Art Fair (2008–10)
Downing College, Cambridge (2009)
The Victoria and Albert Museum of Childhood (2007)
Spike Island Artists' Studios (2006)
Gagosian Gallery Rome (2006)
Gagosian Gallery Davies St (2006)
Stephen Friedman Gallery (2005)
Hallfield Primary School (2005)
Brick House (2005)
Gagosian Gallery Britannia St (2005)
Stortorget, Kalmar (2004)
Coate House (2001)
Barbican Concert Hall (2001)
New Art Gallery Walsall (2000)
Bankside Directional Signage System (1999)
House in Lincolnshire (1994)

Awards
The firm won the RIBA Stirling Prize in 2016 for Newport Street Gallery, which was built to house the private art collection of artist Damien Hirst, after being shortlisted for the prize in 2000 and 2006 for Walsall Art Gallery and Brick House, respectively.
Both the New Art Gallery, Walsall (2000) and the Brick House, London (2006) have been short listed for the Stirling Prize, the UK’s most prestigious architecture award, in recognition of this ambition.

Teaching
Both Adam Caruso and Peter St John have taught in architecture schools consistently throughout the lifetime of Caruso St John. Adam Caruso taught at the University of North London from 1990 to 2000 and was Professor of Architecture at the University of Bath from 2002 to 2005. He has been Visiting Professor at the Academy of Architecture in Mendrisio, at the Graduate School of Design  at Harvard University, at  ETH Zürich, and on the LSE Cities Programme at the London School of Economics. In 2011 Adam Caruso was appointed Professor of Architecture and Construction at  ETH Zürich.

Peter St John taught at the University of North London from 1990 to 2000. He was a Visiting Professor at the Academy of Architecture in Mendrisio, Switzerland from 1999 to 2001, and Visiting Professor in the Department of Architecture and Civil Engineering at the University of Bath from 2001 to 2004. In 2005 he was a visiting critic at the Graduate School of Design  at Harvard University. From 2007 to 2009, he was a visiting professor at  ETH Zürich. He is currently an external examiner at the Scott Sutherland School of Architecture in Aberdeen and Cardiff School of Architecture and running a design unit at London Metropolitan University (previously University of North London)

References

External links
Practice website
The New Art Gallery Walsall
Digital edition of Caruso St John monograph published by El Croquis magazine

Architecture firms based in London
Design companies established in 1990
1990 establishments in England